The Frontier is a 1991 Chilean drama film, directed by Ricardo Larraín and starring Patricio Contreras and Gloria Laso. Larraín won the Silver Bear for an outstanding single achievement at the 42nd Berlin International Film Festival. The film was submitted as Chile's entry for the Best Foreign Language Film category at the 64th Academy Awards, but was not nominated.

Plot 
During the final years of Chile's military dictatorship, Ramiro Orellana is sentenced to internal exile. He is sent to the La Frontera region, a historic boundary between the Mapuche people and Spanish colonization. In La Frontera, Ramiro discovers a new dimension of life that prompts him to confront his own inner boundaries...

Cast
 Patricio Contreras as Ramiro Orellana
 Gloria Laso as Maite
 Alonso Venegas as Delegate
 Sergio Schmied as Secretary
 Aldo Bernales as Diver
 Héctor Noguera as Father Patricio
 Patricio Bunster as Don Ignacio
 Aníbal Reyna as Detective robusto
 Sergio Hernández as Detective Delgado
 Elsa Poblete as Laura
 Sergio Madrid as Gutiérrez
 Joaquin Velasco as Hernán
 Griselda Núñez as Sra. Hilda
 Eugenio Morales as Assistant Driver
 Raqual Curilem as Bar Owner

See also
 List of submissions to the 64th Academy Awards for Best Foreign Language Film
 List of Chilean submissions for the Academy Award for Best Foreign Language Film

References

External links
 
 

1991 films
1991 drama films
Spanish drama films
1990s Spanish-language films
Films directed by Ricardo Larraín
Chilean drama films